Fire is the third album by vocalist Fleurine.

Background
Fleurine and pianist Brad Mehldau had played together on the singer's Close Enough for Love. Fire was produced by Robert Sadin.

Music and recording
The album was recorded in New York City around 2003. Two of the 12 tracks are originals. The other tracks include: "Fire" by Bruce Springsteen; "Show Me the Way" by Peter Frampton; "Fruit Tree" by Nick Drake; and Paul Simon's "Still Crazy After All These Years."

Reception
The Los Angeles Times commented on "her warm, enveloping sound and gentle, rhythmic drive transform the songs into something well beyond the original sources."

Track listing
"Fire" – 3:33 Music & lyrics Bruce Springsteen, arrangement by Fleurine
"Fruit Tree" – 5:02 Music & lyrics by Nick Drake, arrangement by Fleurine
"Show Me the Way" – 3:58 Music & lyrics by Peter Frampton
"Suavidade" – 4:55 Music by Jose Lopretti, lyrics by Lilian Vieira & Fleurine
"Brass in Pocket" – 3:48 Music & Lyrics by Chrissie Hynde & James Honeyman Scott, arrangement by Fleurine
"Don't Be Blue" – 4:17 Music by John Guerin & lyrics by Michael Franks, arrangement by Fleurine
"So Tinha de Ser com Você" – 4:12 Music by Jobim, lyrics by Aloysio de Oliveira
"Haven't We Met" – 1:50 Music by Kenny Rankin, lyrics by Ruth Bachelar
"Après un Rêve" – 6:08 Music by Gabriel Faure, lyrics by Romaine Bussine, arrangement by Brad Mehldau & Fleurine
"Still Crazy After All These Years" – 3:29 Music & Lyrics by Paul Simon  arrangement by Brad Mehldau & Fleurine
"Você" – 4:13 Music by Jose Lopretti & Fleurine, lyrics by Fleurine
"Hey Little Girl" – 4:00 Music & lyrics by Fleurine

Personnel
 Fleurine – vocals
 Seamus Blake – tenor sax
 Jesse van Ruller – guitar
 Johan Plomp – bass
 Jeff Ballard – drums, percussion
 Peter Bernstein – guitar (track 6)
 Gil Goldstein – accordion (track 4)
 Brad Mehldau – piano (tracks 2, 9, 12)

References

Fleurine albums
2005 albums